Symphysanodon, also known as the slopefishes, is a genus of small marine fishes. Most are found in the Indo-Pacific, but three species, S. berryi, S. mona, and S. octoactinus, are found in the Western Atlantic. Traditionally, this genus is the only member of the family Symphysanodontidae, but in 2017 a new species, C. aureolateralis, was placed in its own genus Cymatognathus.

Description
The largest species of Symphysanodon can reach  in length. Their bodies are slender and compressed, with blunt snouts. They are red, pink, oranges or yellow in colour. The caudal fin is usually distinctively forked. The dorsal fins have 9 dorsal spines and 10 soft rays, whereas the anal fin has three anal spines and seven or eight soft rays.

Species
There are currently 12 recognized species in this genus:

 Symphysanodon andersoni Kotthaus, 1974 (Buck-toothed slopefish)
 Symphysanodon berryi W. D. Anderson, 1970 (Slope bass)
 Symphysanodon disii Khalaf & Krupp, 2008 (Disi's slopefish)
 Symphysanodon katayamai W. D. Anderson, 1970 (Yellow-stripe slopefish)
 Symphysanodon maunaloae W. D. Anderson, 1970 (Long-tailed slopefish)
 Symphysanodon mona W. D. Anderson & V. G. Springer, 2005 (Akarnax slopefish)
 Symphysanodon octoactinus W. D. Anderson, 1970 (Insular slopefish)
 Symphysanodon parini W. D. Anderson & V. G. Springer, 2005 (Sala y Gómez slopefish) 
 Symphysanodon pitondelafournaisei Quéro, Spitz & Vayne, 2009 (Réunion slopefish)
 Symphysanodon rhax W. D. Anderson & V. G. Springer, 2005 (Maldives slopefish)
 Symphysanodon typus Bleeker, 1878 (Insular shelfbeauty)
 Symphysanodon xanthopterygion W. D. Anderson & Bineesh, 2011 (Indian slopefish)

References

Percoidea
Perciformes genera
Marine fish genera
Taxa named by Pieter Bleeker